Célio de Oliveira Goulart, OFM (Piracema, Minas Gerais, Brazil, 14 September 1944 – São João del-Rei, Minas Gerais, 19 January 2018) was a Roman Catholic bishop of the dioceses of Leopoldina, Cachoeiro de Itapemirim and São João del-Rei, Brazil.

References 

1944 births
2018 deaths
21st-century Roman Catholic bishops in Brazil
Brazilian Friars Minor
Franciscan bishops
Roman Catholic bishops of Cachoeiro de Itapemirim
Roman Catholic bishops of Leopoldina
Roman Catholic bishops of São João del Rei